Lockport is a ghost town in Licking County, in the U.S. state of Ohio.

History
Canal locks were located near the town site.

References

Geography of Licking County, Ohio